Ho Chi Fung (born September 17, 1976) is a Chinese Grand Prix motorcycle racer. He won the 2013 FIM eRoad Racing World Cup.

Career statistics

By season

Races by year
(key)

References

External links
 Profile on motogp.com

Living people
1976 births
Chinese motorcycle racers
250cc World Championship riders